In stochastic analysis, a part of the mathematical theory of probability, a predictable process is a stochastic process whose value is knowable at a prior time.  The predictable processes form the smallest class that is closed under taking limits of sequences and contains all adapted left-continuous processes.

Mathematical definition

Discrete-time process 
Given a filtered probability space , then a stochastic process  is predictable if  is measurable with respect to the  σ-algebra  for each n.

Continuous-time process 
This σ-algebra is also called the predictable σ-algebra.

Examples 
 Every deterministic process is a predictable process.
 Every continuous-time adapted process that is left continuous is obviously a predictable process.

See also 
 Adapted process
 Martingale

References 

Stochastic processes